Richard "Ricky" Manning Jr. (born November 18, 1980) is an American football coach and former cornerback who is the defensive assistant for the New York Jets of the National Football League (NFL). He played college football at UCLA and was drafted by the Carolina Panthers in the third round of the 2003 NFL Draft.  Along with the Panthers he also played for the Chicago Bears, St. Louis Rams, Oakland Raiders, and the Florida Tuskers of the United Football League

Early years
Manning played high school football at Edison High School in Fresno.

College career
Manning started 45 consecutive games for UCLA, which ranks as the second longest streak in school history. His 13 interceptions tie him for seventh all-time among Bruin players. In addition, he made first-team All-Pac-10 for his last three years.

Professional career

Carolina Panthers
Manning was taken in the third round (82nd overall) of the 2003 NFL Draft by Carolina. His first pick came in only his second game, as he intercepted Atlanta Falcons quarterback Doug Johnson. With injuries to the secondary, Manning eventually took over a starting role. His first interception to be returned for a touchdown came against the New York Giants. But he will be forever remembered by Panther fans for his performance during the 2003-04 NFL playoffs. In the NFC Divisional game against the St. Louis Rams, Manning's timely interception of Marc Bulger set up the game-winning touchdown to propel the Panthers into the NFC Championship game against the Philadelphia Eagles. There, Manning made a permanent mark on Panther history by intercepting Donovan McNabb three times en route to the Panthers' victory. Manning became the first rookie to win Defensive Player of the Week honors twice in the same postseason. 's NFL off-season, Manning's 4 postseason interceptions in 2003 remain franchise records for both a career and single season, as do his 3 interceptions in the Philadelphia game.

During the Panthers' injury-riddled 2004 season, Manning helped anchor a defense that ranked first in the league in interceptions. Against the Rams, Manning and teammate Dan Morgan picked off two passes each, the first game where a pair of teammates had a pair of interceptions in three years.

Chicago Bears
Ricky became a restricted free agent in the following offseason, and the Bears signed him to an offer sheet on April 21.  The Panthers declined to match Chicago's offer, and received a third round pick (88th overall, later used to select James Anderson) from the Bears in the 2006 NFL Draft. Manning intercepted five passes during the 2006 season. He intercepted two passes from Matt Hasselbeck, and later returned an interception for a touchdown against the Minnesota Vikings during week thirteen. He also had an interception during the Divisional Playoffs against the Seattle Seahawks.

Manning saw minimal playtime during the 2007 season, and was used at nickelback. He later worked with the team's third string defense, and tutored Danieal Manning, who would eventually replace him as the team's nickelback.  On August 26, 2008, the Chicago Bears released Ricky after a two-year stint.

St. Louis Rams
On August 31, 2008, Manning agreed to terms with the St. Louis Rams. He officially signed the following day. Then on October 14, 2008, Manning was placed on injured reserve after injuring his foot in a game against the Washington Redskins.

Oakland Raiders
Manning signed with the Oakland Raiders on August 15, 2009 after the team released tight end John Paul Foschi. Manning was released on August 24.

Legal troubles
In 2002 Manning was convicted of assault as a result of a fight with cheerleaders Brian Herbert and Seth Spiker outside a Westwood bar. Originally charged with two counts of felony assault, Manning pleaded not guilty to one count and the other count was dismissed.  He received probation.

On April 23, 2006, Manning attacked Soroush Sabzi, in a Denny's restaurant after first teasing him for working on a laptop computer. He was charged with assault with a deadly weapon.  (Two days before the incident, the Bears had signed Manning to $21 million offer sheet. In light of the assault charge, the Panthers declined to match Chicago's offer and Manning signed with the Bears.)

Facing up to 4 years in prison, Manning pleaded no contest in September 2006 to felony assault in exchange for another probation deal. Later, Manning proclaimed his innocence. He acknowledged having words with the victim then pushing him in the head—but after that, according to him, his former UCLA teammates did the damage.  "Yeah, I did it" explained Manning (AP report). "If I don't plea to this I have to go through trial. We're in season now. Then I'd have to put it in the hands of a jury. There are tons of things that can happen with a jury... I just can't risk that."

The NFL suspended him for one game for this, his second felony assault conviction.

Coaching career
In 2012 Manning was hired to coach his high school alma mater's varsity football team.  He was the Head Coach of the Edison High Tigers, in Fresno, California, for just one year. From there Manning went on to coach 2 seasons at Fresno City College as defensive backs and special teams coach before going back to school at Fresno State and working as a graduate assistant.

Seattle Seahawks
In 2016 Manning was hired as an Assistant Coach with the Seattle Seahawks. It was announced in February 2018, that Manning would not return to the Seahawks for the 2018 season.

New York Jets
Manning was named a defensive assistant on the New York Jets staff in 2021.

NFL statistics

Regular season

Postseason

References

External links
 Just Sports Stats
 Chicago Bears bio
 Oakland Raiders bio
 United Football League bio

1980 births
Living people
Sportspeople from Fresno, California
Players of American football from California
American football cornerbacks
American people convicted of assault
UCLA Bruins football players
Carolina Panthers players
Chicago Bears players
St. Louis Rams players
Oakland Raiders players
Florida Tuskers players
Seattle Seahawks coaches
New York Jets coaches